Hermann "Percy" Vear (12  July 1911 – 16 March 1983), born in Crossflatts, Bingley, West Riding of Yorkshire, England. He was a British professional boxer during the 1920s and 1930s.

Brought up in Crossflatts during the First World War, Vear lived in Keighley all his adult life.  
Boxers are among the most colourful athletes in all of sports, with names like "Hitman", "Bomber" and "Gentleman Jim", so it should come as no surprise that Vear was known as "Percy Vear". It is not known how or who gave Vear his fight name, but in this case it seems likely that "Percy Vear" is a play on the word to "Persevere" (Per·se·vere), which means,

1.	to persist in anything undertaken; maintain a purpose in spite of difficulty, obstacles, or discouragement; continue steadfastly.

2.	to persist in speech, interrogation, argument, etc.; insist.
–verb (used with object)

3.	to bolster, sustain, or uphold: unflagging faith that had persevered him.

Boxing career
Vear was one of the most colourful characters in Keighley's professional boxing scene in the 1920s and 1930s. Vear was one of three fighters under the management of Keighley boxing promoter Sam Scaife during those boxing boom years, who also managed locally based fighters Freddie Irving and Johnny Barrett. Perhaps overshadowed by the other two locally, Vear proved to be a bill topper in his own right in many boxing halls up and down the country.

Boxing first as a flyweight, then bantamweight and later as a featherweight the demand of the boxing boom proved so hectic that going on for 30 fights a year were common (more that a lot of boxers today have in a lifetime).

Vear had 131 bouts (many as a substitute) during his professional career, spanning from February 1929 to November 1934.

Professional debut
His first professional fight aged 17 saw flyweight Vear lose a six round contest on points to (Bradford born) Young Broadley at a packed Drill Hall, Keighley on Monday 11 February 1929.

His second and third professional fights were against Silsden fighter Maurice Emmott, both of which ended in respectful draws for both boxers. The local newspaper, the Keighley News reported "Vear took a lot of  punishment in the first two rounds, and had his opponent not been more accurate with his blows Vear would most certainly have been knocked out. As it was, Emmott's methods were very crude, but he did the greater part of attacking. As the fight progressed Vear showed improvement, and the decision of a draw was well received".

His bout with Barrett in Workington was hailed by the local press as the best fight ever seen in the area.

The Big Fight:  Vear -v- Irving

Two professional boxers from the same stable (run by Mr Sam Scaife) were both making names for themselves, Percy Vear and Freddie Irving.

In just three weeks during 1932 they both took on a formidable opponent called Young Tucker of Nelson. 17-year-old Irving forced him to a draw at Colne, while Vear brought off a points win in Keighley Drill Hall. These creditable performances by these two stable mates aroused the interest of the boxing public, and this inevitably led to a money-match being staged in the Drill Hall on 11 April 1932.

It was reported at the time "The contest was one of ten 2 minute rounds at 9st, under forfeit. There were side-stakes of £25, plus a substantial purse offered by the promoter".

The match was one of the biggest local attractions Keighley fight fans had even seen for many years. They responded well and there was a capacity crowd of 1,400. The cost per ticket was 2s. 4d. for reserved seats and 1s. 2d for the remainder. Mr Harry Jennings of Bradford refereed the match and held the purse. The local newspaper, the Keighley News, which gave considerable space to boxing, reported, "that it was not until the final two rounds that Vear really came into contention".

Vear had obviously been saving himself, but by the time he had reached the point of wearing down Irving's defence it was too late. Irving took the match and the purse on a points verdict and it was a fitting climax to the 1931–32 fight season.

Other sporting activities outside boxing
Following his boxing career, Vear was involved with his local association football club, Keighley Town.

He offered his services as fitness and exercise coach to the team. He helped structure the training and exercises on training nights and assisted in giving the embrocation muscle rubs before a game and at half-time.

The club played in the Old Yorkshire League for two seasons between 1946–47 and 1947–48 before folding.

The club was subsequently reformed in 1981 by ex-Wales and Bradford City footballer Trevor Hockey.

Personal life
Vear was born 12 July 1911 to parents Frederick Henry Vear & Eliza Vear (nee Heath).
He married Doreen Vear (Nee Grayston) on 16 July 1932 at Holy Trinity Church, Lawkholme, Keighley, West Yorkshire and they had three children, 2 sons, Terence & Leslie & a daughter, Yvonne. 
Vear worked as a store keeper in a Bakehouse and later in life as a shot blaster for a local firm in Keighley the "Rustless Iron Company Ltd" now known under the acronym Trico Vitreous Enamel, and moved to the nearby town of Bingley.  He worked there until his retirement in the mid 1970s. The sole activity of the company was the vitreous enamelling of metal products and components with the ability to enamel anything from a bath to a cap badge. On 3 January 1974, Vear was presented by the "Rustless Iron Company Ltd" with an analogue "Gold Watch" for 25 years loyal service to the company.

Vear's wife died of cancer in March 1968, and in September 1971 Vear remarried. He lived with his second wife Florence May Vear (Nee Parkin) at Broomfield Road, Keighley. Vear became ill in his late 60s and spent the last year of his life being cared for at Holmewood Residential Home, Fell Lane, Keighley.

On 12 July 2007, 96 years to the day of Vear's birth, his great-grandson, from his youngest son Leslie's line of descendants, was born. He is aptly named Jenson Percy Leslie Vear.

In 2009, Christopher Dunn (illustrator) staged an exhibition of his watercolours entitled "Bingley Secrets".  One of his pieces was of boxer Vear sitting on top of Damart UK Headquarters factory chimney overlooking Bingley.

In 2012, a 'Traditional Real Ale' public house was named after Vear in his home town of Keighley in Aireworth Street in honour of his achievements. There is a Pint of real ale beer named after Vear aptly named "Percy’s Pint", which may be found and consumed on the premise. This beer is specially brewed by Empire Brewery in Huddersfield. There is another pub in Leymoor road, Golcar, Huddersfield called Percy Vear.

Career record

|-
|align="center" colspan=8|43 Wins (3 knockouts, 38 decisions, 1 retired, 1 disqualifications), 28 Losses (1 knockouts, 23 decisions, 3 retired, 1 disqualifications), 14 Draws 
|-
| align="center" style="border-style: none none solid solid; background: #e3e3e3"|Res.
| align="center" style="border-style: none none solid solid; background: #e3e3e3"|Opponent
| align="center" style="border-style: none none solid solid; background: #e3e3e3"|Type
| align="center" style="border-style: none none solid solid; background: #e3e3e3"|Rd., Time
| align="center" style="border-style: none none solid solid; background: #e3e3e3"|Date
| align="center" style="border-style: none none solid solid; background: #e3e3e3"|Location, UK
| align="center" style="border-style: none none solid solid; background: #e3e3e3"|Notes
|-align=center
|-align=center
|Loss
|align=left| Young Broadley (Bradford)
|Decision
|6 (6)
|1929-02-11
|align=left|Drill Hall, Keighley
|Handbill misspelt as "Veer"
|-align=center
|Draw
|align=left| Maurice Emmott (Silsden)
|x
|6 (6)
|1929-03-18
|align=left|Drill Hall, Keighley
|Handbill misspelt as "Veer"
|-align=center
|Draw
|align=left| Maurice Emmott (Silsden)
|x
|6 (6)
|1929-04-08
|align=left|Drill Hall, Keighley
|Handbill misspelt as "Veer"
|-align=center
|Draw
|align=left| Dusty Young (Harrogate)
|x
|6 (6)
|1929-08-21
|align=left|In the Woodlands Hotel Gardens, Harrogate
|
|-align=center
|Draw
|align=left| Young Mack (Harrogate)
|x
|6 (6)
|1929-09-11
|align=left|In the Woodlands Hotel Gardens, Harrogate
|
|-align=center
|Win
|align=left| Mick Walsh (Harrogate)
|Decision
|6 (6)
|1929-10-21
|align=left|Starbeck Physical Culture Room, Starbeck
|Handbill misspelt as "Vere"
|-align=center
|Draw
|align=left| Young Hargreaves (Dewsbury)
|x
|6 (6)
|1929-10-27
|align=left|Batley Physical Culture Club, Batley
|
|-align=center
|Draw
|align=left| Young Broadley (Bradford)
|x
|6 (6)
|1929-10-28
|align=left|Drill Hall, Keighley
|2nd Fight in two days
|-align=center
|Loss
|align=left| Danny Wakelam (Castleford)
|Decision
|8 (8)
|1929-11-29
|align=left|Gaiety Skating Rink, Castleford
|Handbill misspelt as "Veare"
|-align=center
|Win
|align=left| Maurice Emmott (Silsden)
|Decision
|6 (6)
|1929-12-09
|align=left|Drill Hall, Keighley
|
|-align=center
|Loss
|align=left| Teddy Talbot (Warrington)
|Stopped
|8 (8)
|1929-12-25
|align=left|The Rink, Knaresborough
|Handbill marked as A.N.Other
|-align=center
|Loss
|align=left| Danny Wakelam (Castleford)
|Decision
|8 (8)
|1930-01-15
|align=left|The Rink, Batley Carr, Dewsbury
|Handbill misspelt as "Veare"
|-align=center
|Win
|align=left| Tommy Boylan (Barrow)
|Decision
|8 (8)
|1930-02-17
|align=left|Drill Hall, Workington
|
|-align=center
|Win
|align=left| Maurice Emmott (Silsden)
|Decision
|8 (8)
|1930-02-24
|align=left|Drill Hall, Keighley
|
|-align=center
|Win
|align=left| Jack Inwood (Birstall) 
|Decision
|8 (8)
|1930-03-03
|align=left|Birstall Physical Culture Club, Birstall
|Handbill misspelt as "Veare"
|-align=center
|Loss
|align=left| Dod Lockland (Bradford)
|Decision
|8 (8)
|1930-03-10
|align=left|Horton Green Social Club, Bradford
|Handbill misspelt as "Veare"
|-align=center
|Loss
|align=left| Mick Walsh (Harrogate)
|Decision
|8 (8)
|1930-03-17
|align=left|Ideal Skating Rink, Harrogate
|Handbill misspelt as "Vere"
|-align=center
|Draw
|align=left| Danny Wakelam (Castleford)
|x
|8 (8)
|1930-03-24
|align=left|Drill Hall, Keighley
|
|-align=center
|Loss
|align=left| Danny Wakelam (Castleford)
|Decision
|8 (8)
|1930-04-06
|align=left|Horton Green Social Club, Bradford
|Handbill misspelt as "Veare"
|-align=center
|Loss
|align=left| Young Broadley (Bradford)
|Decision
|8 (8)
|1930-04-07
|align=left|Birstall Physical Culture Club, Birstall
|Handbill misspelt as "Veare"
|-align=center
|Win
|align=left| John Barrett (Keighley)
|Decision
|8 (8)
|1930-05-05
|align=left|Drill Hall, Workington
|
|-align=center
|Win
|align=left| Jack White (Bradford)
|Decision
|6 (6)
|1930-06-02
|align=left|Drill Hall, Keighley
|
|-align=center
|Loss
|align=left| Boy Gibson (Bradford)
|KO
|4 (8)
|1930-06-30
|align=left|The Black Swan, Harrogate
|Vear substitute for Alfred Buck
|-align=center
|Win
|align=left| Joe Speight
|KO
|8 (8)
|1930-07-15
|align=left|Gomersal
|
|-align=center
|Win
|align=left| Jack Smith (Shipley)
|Decision
|8 (8)
|1930-09-01
|align=left|Victoria Hall, Saltaire
|Handbill misspelt as "Veare"
|
|-align=center
|Win
|align=left| Tommy Gallagher (Huddersfield)
|Decision
|6 (6)
|1930-09-28
|align=left|Vulcan Athletic Club, Dewsbury
|
|-align=center
|Loss
|align=left| Freddie Irving (Keighley)
|Decision
|6 (6)
|1930-09-29
|align=left|Drill Hall, Keighley
|Vear substitute for Young Haggas
|-align=center
|Win
|align=left| Young Kirkley (Leeds)
|Decision
|8 (8)
|1930-11-10
|align=left|The Baths, Normanton
|
|-align=center
|Win
|align=left| Young Dudley (Wakefield)
|Decision
|10 (10)
|1930-11-16
|align=left|The Premier School of Boxing, Liversedge
|
|-align=center
|Draw
|align=left| Harry Johnson (Macclesfield)
|x
|8 (8)
|1930-11-24
|align=left|Drill Hall, Keighley
|
|-align=center
|Win
|align=left| Joe Speight (Birstall)
|Stopped
|4 (6)
|1930-12-08
|align=left|Drill Hall, Keighley
|Vear substitute for Young Ogden
|-align=center
|Win
|align=left| Eric (Kid) Lawton (Goole)
|Decision
|10 (10)
|1930-12-14
|align=left|The Premier School of Boxing, Liversedge
|
|-align=center
|Win
|align=left| Kid Close (Holbeck, Leeds)
|Decision
|8 (8)
|1930-12-21
|align=left|The Windsor Stadium, Leeds
|
|-align=center
|Win
|align=left| Johnny Parker (Doncaster)
|Decision
|10 (10)
|1931-01-18
|align=left|The Premier School of Boxing, Liversedge
|
|-align=center
|Win
|align=left| Jim Burrows (Barnsley)
|Decision
|8 (8)
|1931-01-23
|align=left|Drill Hall, Keighley
|
|-align=center
|Win
|align=left| Mickey Ryan (Leeds)
|Decision
|10 (10)
|1931-03-09
|align=left|Drill Hall, Keighley
|Ryan stand-in for Young Stafford
|-align=center
|Draw
|align=left| Johnny Nolan (Bradford)
|x
|10 (10)
|1931-03-23
|align=left|The New Stadium, Bradford
|
|-align=center
|Win
|align=left| Kid Eccles (Leeds)
|Decision
|10 (10)
|1931-04-06
|align=left|Drill Hall, Keighley
|
|-align=center
|Win
|align=left| Jackie Quinn (Bradford)
|Decision
|10 (10)
|1931-05-04
|align=left|The Windsor Stadium, Leeds
|
|-align=center
|Draw
|align=left| Mick Howard (Liverpool)
|x
|10 (10)
|1931-06-03
|align=left|Wigan
|controversial draw, Vear appeared to be easy Winner
|-align=center
|Loss
|align=left| Dickie Inckles (Sheffield)
|Decision
|12 (12)
|1931-06-15
|align=left|Don Road Stadium, Sheffield
|
|-align=center
|Win
|align=left| Billy Sullivan (Silsden)
|Decision
|10 (10)
|1931-07-05
|align=left|The Picture House, Streethouse, Pontefract
|
|-align=center
|Win
|align=left| Jacky Skelly (Barnsley)
|Decision
|10 (10)
|1931-07-11
|align=left|The Plant Hotel, Mexborough
|
|-align=center
|Win
|align=left| Dickie Inckles (Sheffield)
|Decision
|12 (12)
|1931-07-15
|align=left|Don Road Stadium, Sheffield
|Inckles had verdicts over Jackie Brown (British Champion) & Bert Kirby (Ex-Champion)
|-align=center
|Loss
|align=left| Jackie Webster (Normanton)
|Decision
|12 (12)
|1931-07-29
|align=left|Newhall Sports Ground, Attercliffe, Sheffield
|
|-align=center
|Win
|align=left| Billy Gritt (Doncaster)
|Decision
|10 (10)
|1931-08-01
|align=left|Open-air boxing at The Plant Hotel, Mexborough
|
|-align=center
|Draw
|align=left| Joe Goodall (Castleford)
|x
|12 (12)
|1931-08-15
|align=left|Newhall Sports Ground, Attercliffe, Sheffield
|
|-align=center
|Win
|align=left| Steve Firman (Swinton, Mexborough)
|Decision
|10 (10)
|1931-08-23
|align=left|The Brunswick Stadium, Leeds
|
|-align=center
|Draw
|align=left| Steve Firman (Swinton, Mexborough)
|x
|10 (10)
|1931-08-28
|align=left|Denaby, Doncaster
|
|-align=center
|Loss
|align=left| Young Dandy (Scunthorpe)
|Decision
|10 (10)
|1931-09-20
|align=left|The Brunswick Stadium, Leeds
|
|-align=center
|Loss
|align=left| George Aldred (Bolton)
|Decision
|10 (10)
|1931-10-12
|align=left|Olympia Skating Ring, Wakefield
|Aldred substitute for Joe Speakman
|
|-align=center
|Loss
|align=left| Dyke Archer (Salford)
|Decision
|12 (12)
|1931-10-22
|align=left|Colne
|
|-align=center
|Win
|align=left| Mickey Callaghan (Leeds)
|Decision
|10 (10)
|1931-10-25
|align=left|The Brunswick Stadium, Leeds
|Callaghan substitute for Jacky Barber
|-align=center
|Win
|align=left| Willie Walsh (Oldham)
|Decision
|10 (10)
|1931-11-03
|align=left|British Legion Club, Huddersfield
|
|-align=center
|Loss
|align=left| Seaman Dobson (Leeds)
|Decision
|12 (12)
|1931-11-27
|align=left|Imperial Boxing Hall, Barnsley
|Vear Substitute for Johnny Regan
|-align=center
|Draw
|align=left| Young Creasy (Newark)
|X
|10 (10)
|1931-12-03
|align=left|Victoria Baths, Nottingham
|
|-align=center
|Loss
|align=left| George Aldred (Bolton)
|Decision
|10 (10)
|1931-12-13
|align=left|The Brunswick Stadium, Leeds
|Handbill misspelt as "Veir"
|-align=center
|Win
|align=left| Tiny Smith (Sheffield)
|Disqualification
|6 (10
|1931-12-13
|align=left|Rotherham
|
|-align=center
|Draw
|align=left| Young Kilbride (Leeds)
|X
|10 (10)
|1932-01-11
|align=left|Drill Hall, Keighley
|
|-align=center
|Win
|align=left| Bob Healey (Bolton)
|Decision
|10 (10)
|1932-02-08
|align=left|Skipton
|
|-align=center
|Win
|align=left| Jackie Quinn (Bradford)
|Decision
|10 (10)
|1932-02-15
|align=left|Drill Hall, Keighley
|
|-align=center
|Win
|align=left| Kid Cassidy (Stockton)
|Decision
|10 (10)
|1932-02-21
|align=left|The Brunswick Stadium, Leeds
|Handbill misspelt as "Veir"
|-align=center
|Win
|align=left| Young Tucker (Nelson)
|Decision
|10 (10)
|1932-03-21
|align=left|Drill Hall, Keighley
|Tucker substitute for George Taylor
|-align=center
|Win
|align=left| Tom Goodall (Castleford)
|Decision
|12 (12)
|1932-03-29
|align=left|Drill Hall, Workington
|
|-align=center
|Loss
|align=left| Freddie Irving (Keighley)
|Decision
|10 (10)
|1932-04-11
|align=left|Drill Hall, Keighley
|
|-align=center
|Loss
|align=left| Billy Shaw (Leeds)
|Decision
|10 (10)
|1932-05-14
|align=left|Goit Stock Pleasure Grounds, Bingley
|
|-align=center
|Loss
|align=left| Tom Cowley (Thurnscoe)
|Decision
|12 (12)
|1932-05-16
|align=left|The Racing Track, Goldthorpe
|
|-align=center
|Win
|align=left| Young Kennedy (Maltby)
|Decision
|10 (10)
|1932-06-04
|align=left|Drill Hall, Workington
|
|-align=center
|Loss
|align=left| Billy Smith (Huddersfield)
|Disqualification
|5 (6)
|1932-06-18
|align=left|Drill Hall, Keighley
|
|-align=center
|Loss
|align=left| Jackie Quinn (Bradford)
|Decision
|10 (10)
|1932-07-01
|align=left|The Plant Hotel, Mexborough
|
|-align=center
|Loss
|align=left| Sid Ellis (Manchester)
|Decision
|10 (10)
|1932-07-22
|align=left|Nelson Football Ground, Nelson
|
|-align=center
|Loss
|align=left| Billy Shaw (Leeds)
|Decision
|10 (10)
|1932-08-08
|align=left|Keighley RL Football Ground (Cougar Park), Keighley
|Vear substitute for Freddie Irving
|-align=center
|Loss
|align=left| Billy Shaw (Leeds)
|Decision
|8 (8)
|1932-xx-xx
|align=left|Leeds
|
|-align=center
|Win
|align=left| Jackie Quinn (Bradford)
|Decision
|10 (10)
|1932-11-07
|align=left|Windsor Hall, Bradford
|Vear substitute for Freddy Irving
|-align=center
|Win
|align=left| Dick Greaves (Salford)
|Retired
|10 (12)
|1932-11-10
|align=left|Alexandra Stadium, Colne
|
|-align=center
|Win
|align=left| Tommy Barber (Bradford)
|Decision
|10 (10)
|1932-11-14
|align=left|Olympia, Bradford
|
|-align=center
|Win
|align=left| Tommy Barber (Bradford)
|Decision
|10 (10)
|1932-11-27
|align=left|Leeds National Sporting Club
|
|-align=center
|Loss
|align=left| Hyman Gordon (Manchester)
|Retired hurt – burst ear
|9 (10)
|1932-12-01
|align=left|Alexandra Stadium, Colne
|
|-align=center
|Win
|align=left| Young Monk (Dinnington)
|Decision
|10 (10)
|1933-01-16
|align=left|Drill Hall, Halifax
|
|-align=center
|Win
|align=left| Bobby Thackray (Leeds)
|Decision
|10 (10)
|1933-02-06
|align=left|Drill Hall, Keighley
|
|-align=center
|Win
|align=left| Darkie Carr (Glasgow)
|Decision
|10 (10)
|1933-02-10
|align=left|Wakefield Boxing Stadium, Wakefield
|
|-align=center
|Win
|align=left| Danny Wakelam (Castleford)
|Decision
|10 (10)
|1933-02-24
|align=left|The Gaiety, Castleford
|
|-align=center
|Loss
|align=left| Charlie Barlow (Manchester)
|Stopped by referee
|1 (10)
|1933-03-03
|align=left|Blackpool Tower Circus, Blackpool
|Barlow current contender for Lightweight Champion of Great Britain
|-align=center
|Loss
|align=left| Mattie Hinds (Durham)
|Decision
|12 (12)
|1933-03-11
|align=left|Theatre Royal, Sunderland
|
|-align=center
|Win
|align=left| Jackie Webster (Normanton)
|Stopped by Knockout
|7 (10)
|1933-03-17
|align=left|Drill Hall, Normanton
|
|-align=center
|Win
|align=left| Owen Moran (Leeds)
|Decision
|15 (15)
|1933-03-22
|align=left|Winter Gardens, Morecambe
|
|-align=center
|Draw
|align=left| George Stead (Manchester)
|x
|15 (15)
|1933-04-12
|align=left|Winter Gardens,Morecambe
|
|-align=center
|Loss
|align=left| Jack Clayton (Bradford)
|Decision
|10 (10)
|1933-05-01
|align=left|Olympia, Bradford
|
|-align=center
|Loss
|align=left| Walter (Kid Chocolate) Melgram (Otley)
|Stopped
|x (8)
|1933-05-14
|align=left|Brunswick Stadium, Leeds
|
|-align=center
|Loss
|align=left| Jack Clayton (Bradford)
|Decision
|10 (10)
|1933-06-07
|align=left|Goit Stock, Bingley
|
|-align=center
|Loss
|align=left| Danny Veitch (Sunderland)
|Decision
|10 (10)
|1933-06-24
|align=left|West Hartlepool
|
|-align=center
|Loss
|align=left| Spud Murphy (Manchester)
|Stopped
|3 (15)
|1933-07-19
|align=left|Winter Gardens,Morecambe
|
|-align=center
|Loss
|align=left| Jim Driscoll (North Shields)
|Stopped
|7 (xx)
|1933-10-20
|align=left|North Shields Stadium, North Shields
|
|-align=center
|Loss
|align=left| Bob Caulfield (Manchester)
|Decision
|10 (10)
|1933-10-22
|align=left|Brunswick Stadium, Leeds
|
|-align=center
|Win
|align=left| Jim Holding (Leeds)
|Decision
|10 (10)
|1933-11-03
|align=left|The Picture House, Streethouse, Pontefract
|
|-align=center
|Loss
|align=left| Walt Jacques (Keighley)
|Decision
|8 (8)
|1933-11-13
|align=left|Drill Hall, Keighley
|Vear & Jacques replaced Williams & Lee on the boxing card
|-align=center
|Loss
|align=left| Jack Crow (Halifax)
|Decision
|6 (6)
|1933-12-08
|align=left|Drill Hall, Halifax
|
|-align=center
|Loss
|align=left| Bill Lambert (Burnley)
|Decision
|10 (10)
|1934-01-11
|align=left|Imperial Ballroom, Nelson
|
|-align=center
|Loss
|align=left| Young Tucker (Nelson)
|Decision
|10 (10)
|1934-02-08
|align=left|Imperial Ballroom, Nelson
|
|-align=center
|Loss
|align=left| Jack Carrick (Hull)
|Stopped
|3 (10)
|1934-02-26
|align=left|Hull
|
|-align=center
|Loss
|align=left| Stan Hughes (Huddersfield)
|Stopped
|6 (10)
|1934-11-12
|align=left|Drill Hall, Keighley
|Vear Substitute for Jacques
|

References

Sources 
https://web.archive.org/web/20110928165232/http://www.britishboxing.net/boxers_15178-Percy-Vear.html
https://web.archive.org/web/20030929083016/http://www.prewarboxing.co.uk/boxer%20lists/V%20list.htm
https://web.archive.org/web/20050216070434/http://www.prewarboxing.co.uk/records/danny%20wakelam.htm
http://www.boxrec.com/list_bouts.php?human_id=318137&cat=boxer
http://archive.thisisbradford.co.uk/2001/12/14/132340.html
http://archive.cravenherald.co.uk/2001/12/14/132340.html

1911 births
English male boxers
Flyweight boxers
Bantamweight boxers
Featherweight boxers
People from Bingley
Sportspeople from Keighley
1983 deaths
Sport in the City of Bradford